Angelika Kern (born 31 August 1952) is a German gymnast. She competed at the 1968 Summer Olympics and the 1972 Summer Olympics.

References

External links
 

1952 births
Living people
German female artistic gymnasts
Olympic gymnasts of West Germany
Gymnasts at the 1968 Summer Olympics
Gymnasts at the 1972 Summer Olympics
People from Emmendingen
Sportspeople from Freiburg (region)